Général, nous voilà! is a 1997 documentary film directed by Ali Essafi in his directorial debut. It won a Grand Jury Award at the Festival International du Film Francophone de Namur. It was shown at the Carthage Film Festival and at the Paris Biennale of Arab Cinema.

References 

1997 films
1997 documentary films
French documentary films
Moroccan documentary films
1990s French films